The Minister of Infrastructure and Water Management is the head of the Ministry of Infrastructure and Water Management and a member of the Cabinet and the Council of Ministers. The incumbent minister is Mark Harbers of the People's Party for Freedom and Democracy (VVD) who has been in office since 10 January 2022. Regularly a State Secretary is assigned to the Ministry who is tasked with specific portfolios. The current State Secretary is Vivianne Heijnen of the Christian Democratic Appeal (CDA) party who also has been in office since 10 January 2022 and has been assigned the portfolios of Aviation, Water Management and Weather Forecasting.

List of Ministers of Infrastructure
For full list, see List of Ministers of Transport of the Netherlands.

List of State Secretaries for Infrastructure

List of Ministers of Housing

List of Ministers without Portfolio for Housing

List of State Secretaries for Housing

See also
 Ministry of Infrastructure and Water Management
 Ministry of Transport and Water Management
 Ministry of Housing, Spatial Planning and the Environment

References

Infrastructure